Daan Klinkenberg (born 12 January 1996) is a Dutch professional football player who plays as a centre-back for Veikkausliiga club HIFK. He has played in the Netherlands, Finland, Norway and Sweden.

Club career
He made his professional debut in the Eerste Divisie for FC Volendam on 29 January 2016 in a game against VVV-Venlo.

On 12 January 2019, his contract with FC Volendam was dissolved by mutual consent. Five days later, he then joined FC Inter Turku in Finland on a one-year contract.

On 31 December 2021, he returned to Finland and joined HIFK on a one-year contract with an option to extend.

References

External links
 

1996 births
Living people
People from Haarlemmermeer
Dutch footballers
FC Volendam players
FC Inter Turku players
Aalesunds FK players
Mjällby AIF players
HIFK Fotboll players
Eerste Divisie players
Veikkausliiga players
Eliteserien players
Allsvenskan players
Association football defenders
Dutch expatriate footballers
Expatriate footballers in Finland
Dutch expatriate sportspeople in Finland
Expatriate footballers in Norway
Dutch expatriate sportspeople in Norway
Expatriate footballers in Sweden
Dutch expatriate sportspeople in Sweden
Footballers from North Holland